Rajakeh (also Romanized as Rajākeh) is a village in Alan Rural District, in the Central District of Sardasht County, West Azerbaijan Province, Iran. At the 2006 census, its population was 53, in 12 families.

References 

Populated places in Sardasht County